The Inspector-General is a 1952 Soviet comedy film directed by Vladimir Petrov.

Plot 
The film is based on the play The Government Inspector by Nikolay Gogol.

Starring 
 Igor Gorbachyov as Ivan Alexandrovich Khlestakov, the 'inspector general' (as I. Gorbachev)
 Yuriy Tolubeev as Mayor Anton Antonovich Skvoznik-Dmukhanovsky
 Anastasiya Georgievskaya as Mme. Anna Andreyevna Skvoznik-Dmukhanoskaya (as Anastasiya Georgiyevskaya)
 Tamara Nosova as Maria Antonovna Skvoznik-Dmukhanovskaya
 Alexander Polinsky as Pyotr Ivanovich Dobchinsky
 Vasiliy Kornukov as Pyotr Ivanovich Bobchinsky (as V. Kornukov)
 Sergei Blinnikov as Judge Ammos Fyodorovich Lyapkin-Tyapkin
 Mikhail Yanshin as Commissioner of Charities Artemy Filippovich Zemlyanika
 Erast Garin as Postmaster Ivan Kuzmich Shepkin
 Pavel Pavlenko as School Supt. Luka Lukich Khlopov (as P. Pavlenko)
 A. Guzeyev as Dr. Christian Ivanovich Hubner
 Aleksey Gribov as Osip
 Elena Ponsova as Ivanova, a sergeant's widow (as E. Ponsova)
 N. Timyakov as A Merchant
 Anastasiya Zueva as Fevonya Poshlyopkina (as A. Zuyeva)
 Vladimir Yershov as Gendarme (uncredited)

References

External links 
 

1952 films
1950s Russian-language films
Soviet films based on plays
Films based on The Government Inspector
Soviet comedy films
1952 comedy films